Falsifier (transliteration: Falsifikator) is a 2013 Serbian comedy film directed by Goran Marković.

Cast 
 Tihomir Stanić as Andjelko
 Branka Katić as Mirjana
 Dušan Plavšić as Slobodan
 Sergej Trifunović as Enes
 Goran Navojec as Kangrga
 Emir Hadžihafizbegović as Suljo

References

External links 

2013 comedy films
2013 films
Films set in Yugoslavia
Serbian comedy films
2010s Serbian-language films